Oggy and the Cockroaches: Next Generation is a French animated series produced by Xilam Animation for the streaming service Netflix. It is a reboot of Xilam's long-running animated series, Oggy and the Cockroaches. Like the original series, it focuses on the wacky antics of Oggy and the trio of mischievous cockroaches that inhabit his house. Aside from the titular characters, the series also introduces the addition of the seven-year old Piya – an optimistic elephant from India whom Oggy has to look after.

Unlike Oggy Oggy, both of which had episodes that last 22 minutes and contain three self-contained segments, or the original, Next Generations episodes last for 43 minutes with six segments each. While it is about slapstick, the series tones itself down compared to the original, with a focus on Oggy's friendship with Piya. However, like the original, the reboot still lacks any actual dialogue – characters frequently express themselves with a variety of noises. It thus only has one dub (the Indian dub).

While archival recordings of Hugues Le Bars were used for the main characters (along with new audio), Kaycie Chase voices Piya, the latter of whom also performed the opening theme.

Plot 
Oggy is an anthropomorphic cat living in the modern suburbs, who shares his home with three trouble-making roaches – Joey, Dee Dee and Marky – who usually desire to drive him insane in a variety of ways. Oggy's Indian friends are also on vacation, dropping off their daughter; Piya, a 7-year old elephant, to be his new roommate. While Oggy will also have to deal with being her new caretaker – and by extent, father figure, the cockroaches will use her fun-loving, caring nature to their advantage.

Characters 

The characters from the original series had received changes for this reboot – while Jack, Bob and Olivia are now minor characters, Oggy and Olivia's relationship remains vague (as they were married in the original's season 4 finale), Kevin (a new character) now lives with Bob, and some characters have received changes in personality – some of them having redesigns.

Main characters 
Oggy - A dorky and laid-back, yet caring father figure. He is a light blue cat with detachable black ears, green eyes and a red nose. In this incarnation, he has matured considerably as he no longer cries often. He is especially protective over Piya and any of his personal belongings. Oggy keeps various a collection of yarn-based items, and goes fishing as a hobby. He is the main arch-nemesis of the cockroaches, who he is easily annoyed by. He is also the current caretaker of Piya, seen as her uncle – he even met her when she was still a baby.
The Cockroaches - The eponymous trio who live with Oggy and frequently irritate him. They are not as absurd and extreme with their pranks as the original incarnations, but are still as mischievous as ever. While they live in ventilation pipes, they still freely roam around Oggy's house and follow him wherever he goes, usually to cause mischief and steal some food. In some episodes, the cockroaches are depicted to be nicer (i.e. "A day out" and "The birthday truce").
Joey - The leader. He has a left pink and right yellow eye (a minor change from his original design), a light purple head and a pink body. While he is the smartest, he can get too eager about his newest prank. He is not as hot-headed or greedy as the original incarnation.
Marky - He has curly antennae, pink eyes, a light green head and gray body. Assists Joey and Dee Dee throughout the series. Like the original's episode "Baby Doll", he gets foolishly lovestruck over Piya's doll in "The lost doll", to the point where he annoys the other cockroaches.
Dee Dee - He has light green eyes, a large orange head, and a fat blue body (therefore much more pudgier than his original design). He mostly assists Joey and Marky throughout the series. He also is usually the most gluttonous of the cockroaches, to the point where he will eat things that are unpalatable, or otherwise inedible.
Piya - An optimistic and playful Indian elephant. Peach pink and fat in build, she wears a pink and yellow shirt, with dark brown hair tied into a braided ponytail. She acts like a typical child, but is also a protective neat freak with a fear of spiders. A variety of gags revolve around her trunk, whether it's as an extra hand or to blow strong winds. She is Oggy's "niece" and sometimes the cockroaches' playmate, mostly unaware of what they do – until they either go too far or get her in trouble with Oggy, usually causing her to turn against them.

Recurring characters 
Jack - He is a green cat with a red nose, a gray muzzle, and a salmon-colored tummy. He is Oggy's cousin and Piya's "cousin once removed", being the tougher one compared to Oggy. 
Olivia - She is a white cat, one of Oggy's neighbors and his girlfriend. In this incarnation, she is redesigned to look more lanky, but also lacks her yellow bow.
Bob - He is a large brown bulldog with a red, spiked collar, one of Oggy's neighbors and Kevin's uncle. He is brutish in nature and is not very fond of Oggy. However, in "Dog day afternoon", he constantly cries over the thought Kevin leaving for school.
Kevin - He is a small, orange puppy with a blue nose, and Bob's nephew. Kevin sometimes makes fun of Oggy, but agrees to challenge himself in obtaining a fishing badge in "Scout's honor". In "Dog day afternoon", he also hates going to school.
 Piya's parents - Indian elephants – one a grayish blue and one grayish purple, respectively – who are very large to the point where their faces are not visible. Ever since they literally dropped off Piya to Oggy's house, they went on vacation for a long time. They are easily entertained by Oggy (as his distraction) when they came to check on their daughter, in "Please hold !". Oggy assumed they would take Piya away from him if she even had a small injury.
 A grizzly bear - It lives in a forest far away from the city. It lives carefree unless provoked, as it can become comically aggressive. As such, it once interfered with Oggy and Piya's camping grounds.

Episode list 

Unlike the original series, the official English titles do not have any extra capitalization.

Broadcast
The series was first distributed online on Gulli's streaming services in November 8, 2021. However, it was labeled as Oggy and the Cockroaches eighth season. The series premiered worldwide in Netflix, on July 28, 2022. In India, it also premiered on Sony YAY! on October 24, 2022, albeit labeled as a "brand new season of [Oggy]".

References

External links

2020s French animated television series
2021 French television series debuts
French animated television spin-offs
French children's animated comedy television series
French children's animated adventure television series
French-language Netflix original programming
Animated television series about cats
Animated television series about insects
Animated television series about elephants
Animated television series about children
Animated television series reboots
Netflix children's programming
Animated television series without speech
Xilam